Herpetogramma fluctuosalis, the greater sweet potato webworm moth, is a species of moth of the family Crambidae. It is found in the United States, where it has been recorded from Maryland to Florida, west to Texas. It is also found on the West Indies, and in Mexico.

The wingspan is 22–25 mm. Adults are on wing from April to July and in October and December in Florida.

The larvae feed on Boehmeria cylindrica and Ipomoea batatas.

References

Moths described in 1863
Herpetogramma
Moths of North America